Goranboy (also, Geran’boy, Geranboi, Kasum-Ismailov, Kasum-Ismailovo, Kasum-Izmaylovo, and Qasym Ismayylov) is the capital city of the Goranboy District of Azerbaijan.  The municipality consists of the city of Goranboy and the nearby villages of Qarasüleymanlı, Şahməmmədli, İrəvanlı, and Şurakənd. Vougar Aslanov is from Goranboy.

References

External links

World Gazetteer: Azerbaijan – World-Gazetteer.com

Populated places in Goranboy District